John Hobhouse may refer to:

John Hobhouse, 1st Baron Broughton (1786–1869)
John Hobhouse, Baron Hobhouse of Woodborough (1932–2004), British law lord and lawyer